Quartilla is a character in the Satyricon which is said to be the "first picaresque" novel in Latin although it is not completely extant. This story was written  by Petronius Arbiter in the first century. Quartilla is a follower of the god Priapus and she and her maids are involved with seducing and torturing three of the characters, Encolpius, Ascyltum, and Giton.

She has been the subject of artistic and academic study. It has been proposed that she represents Octavia and her name is a pun like reference for the reader.

References

Bibliography

External links 
 

Fictional ancient Romans
Satyricon